Moreland is a surname. Notable people with the surname include: 

Barry Moreland (born 1943), Australian dancer and choreographer
Bruce Moreland (born 1959), American musician
Earthwind Moreland (born 1977), American football player
Eric Moreland (born 1991), American basketball player
Geoffrey Moreland (1914–1996), English footballer
Jackie Moreland (1938–1971), American basketball player
Jake Moreland (born 1977), American football player
Jarien Moreland (born 1988), American football player
Jimmy Moreland (born 1996), American football player
John Moreland (disambiguation), multiple people
J. P. Moreland (born 1948), American philosopher
Julius C. Moreland (1844–1918), American lawyer and judge
Keith Moreland (born 1954), American baseball player
Mantan Moreland (1902–1973), American actor
Marc Moreland (1958–2002), American musician
Mary L. Moreland (1859–1918), American minister
Michael Moreland (born 1962), American lawyer and politician
Milton C. Moreland, American academic administrator
Mitch Moreland (born 1985), American baseball player
Nate Moreland (1914–1973), American baseball player
Neil Moreland, Scottish footballer
Peggy Moreland, American writer
Prentice Moreland (1925–1988), American singer
Robert Moreland (born 1941), British politician
Robert Moreland (basketball) (born 1938), American basketball coach
Russell Moreland (1901–1986), Scottish footballer and manager
Sherman Moreland (1868–1951), American politician
Tim Moreland, American sportscaster
Tom Moreland, American engineer
Victor Moreland (born 1957), Northern Irish footballer
Whitt L. Moreland (1930–1951), American marine
William Moreland (disambiguation), multiple people

Fictional characters
Bunk Moreland, a character in the television series The Wire